Signode Finland, former Oy M. Haloila Ab, is one of the world's leading companies in the manufacture of pallet-wrapping machines. Signode Finland factories are located in Masku, Finland (fully automatic wrapping machines) and Kardjali, Bulgaria (semi-automatic wrapping machines).

Wrapping Machines 
Signode semi-automatic and fully automatic Octopus wrapping machines are used for wrapping different kinds of pallet loads for example, in the food, beverage and construction industries, and in logistics centres.

The most widely known product in Signode Finland's product range is the fully automatic wrapping machine, Octopus, with over 7000 fully automatic stretch wrapping machines manufactured so far. In 2008, the international media also spotlighted the manufacture of the 3000th Octopus machine.

The Octopus machines have been in production since 1983; when the model was launched it was the first pallet-wrapping machine with a rotating ring system. In 2013 the company celebrated the 30th anniversary of the Octopus range. Octopus is still the market leader at the international level and one of the most widely known brands in the wrapping industry.

Semi-automatic wrapping machines include the Cobra, Ecomat and Rolle.

History 
Haloila was founded in 1972. The first rotary stretch wrapping machines were manufactured in 1976 and in 1983 Haloila introduced the first fully automatic Octopus wrapping machine. Illinois Tool Works Inc. (ITW) purchased Haloila in 1995 and in 2014 Haloila became part of the Signode Industrial Group. In October 2020 Oy M. Haloila Ab changed company name to Signode Finland Oy.

References

Manufacturing companies of Finland